Syria competed at the 2022 World Aquatics Championships in Budapest, Hungary from 17 June to 3 July.

Swimming

Syria entered two swimmers.

Men

See also
List of Syrian records in swimming

References

Nations at the 2022 World Aquatics Championships
2022 in Syrian sport
Syria at the World Aquatics Championships